The Barlaeus Gymnasium is a secondary school in Amsterdam in the Netherlands. It is one of the five categorial gymnasia in Amsterdam, the other four being Vossius Gymnasium, Ignatius Gymnasium, Het 4e gymnasium and Cygnus Gymnasium. It offers a classical curriculum, including studies in Latin and Greek. The school stands opposite the music venue Paradiso, close to the Leidseplein.

Het Stedelijk Gymnasium was established in 1885. It is the oldest of the four gymnasia, although its origins stretch back to the Latijnse scholen (Latin schools) whose existence is documented as far back as 1594. Since 1927, the school has been named after Caspar Barlaeus. Famous alumni include politicians Frits Bolkestein, Els Borst and writer Willem Frederik Hermans.

Former pupils

 Frits Bolkestein
 Els Borst
 Manja Croiset
 Eduard Douwes Dekker 
 Hubertine Heijermans
 Willem Frederik Hermans 
 Xaviera Hollander
 Lucie Horsch
 Willy Lindwer
 Taylan Susam
 A. G. van Hamel

References

Sources
Education inspection report
 Article on the school's reception of funding intended for "problem" schools

External links

  

1885 establishments in the Netherlands
Educational institutions established in 1885
Gymnasiums in the Netherlands
Schools in Amsterdam